Slug Line is singer-songwriter John Hiatt's third album, released in 1979, after four years without a record deal.  It is his first of two albums with MCA Records. It was his first charting album, reaching No. 202 on Billboard's album charts, and also the highest-charting album during his first 15 years as a recording artist.  His 1987 album Bring The Family finally became his first album to crack the top 200.

Track listing
All tracks written by John Hiatt, except where noted

 "You Used to Kiss the Girls" – 2:36
 "The Negroes Were Dancing" – 2:46
 "Slug Line" – 3:02
 "Madonna Road" – 4:23 (Hiatt, Jim Wismar)
 "(No More) Dancin' in the Street" – 2:22
 "Long Night" – 5:18
 "The Night That Kenny Died" – 2:37
 "Radio Girl" – 2:57
 "You're My Love Interest" – 3:19
 "Take Off Your Uniform" – 4:08
 "Sharon's Got a Drugstore" – 2:12
 "Washable Ink" – 3:15

Personnel
John Hiatt – guitar, vocals
Jon Paris – guitar, bass guitar
Doug Yankus – guitar
Veyler Hildebrand – bass
Etan McElroy – piano, background vocals on "Long Night"
B.J. Wilson – drums
Gerry Conway – drums
Bruce Gary – drums
Thom Mooney – drums
Todd Cochran – piano, organ
Technical
Denny Bruce - Producer
Russ Gary - engineer
John Van Hamersveld – art direction
Nick Rozsa – cover photography

References

1979 albums
John Hiatt albums
MCA Records albums
Albums produced by Denny Bruce
New wave albums by American artists